Here is a comprehensive list of studio-recorded songs by Harry Connick Jr. from 1977 to present (Note: Such words as a, an, and the are not recognized as first words of titles):

 
Connick, Harry Jr.
Harry Connick Jr.